Abdulrahman Al-Qurashi (born 25 December 1997) is a Saudi Arabian Paralympic athlete. He won the bronze medal in the men's 100 metres T53 event at the 2020 Summer Paralympics held in Tokyo, Japan. He was the only competitor to win a medal for Saudi Arabia at the 2020 Summer Paralympics.

References 

Living people
1997 births
Place of birth missing (living people)
Paralympic athletes of Saudi Arabia
Athletes (track and field) at the 2020 Summer Paralympics
Medalists at the 2020 Summer Paralympics
Paralympic bronze medalists for Saudi Arabia
Paralympic medalists in athletics (track and field)